The Fulton Building is an historic structure in Pittsburgh, Pennsylvania. Named after inventor Robert Fulton, the building was designed by architect Grosvenor Atterbury and completed in 1906. Construction was funded by industrialist Henry Phipps.

History and features
 Completed in 1906, the building was designed by architect Grosvenor Atterbury. Its construction was funded by industrialist Henry Phipps. It was subsequently named after noted inventor Robert Fulton.

On May 26, 1943 the building hosted America's first night-court for gasoline war ration violators. 

Since 2001, it has been the home of the city's Renaissance Hotel. 

It was listed on the National Register of Historic Places in 2002.

References

Commercial buildings on the National Register of Historic Places in Pennsylvania
Commercial buildings completed in 1906
Commercial buildings in Pittsburgh
Pittsburgh History & Landmarks Foundation Historic Landmarks
National Register of Historic Places in Pittsburgh
1906 establishments in Pennsylvania